Donald Maclean or McLean may refer to:

Scottish noblemen
 Donald Maclean, 1st Laird of Ardgour (fl. 1410) 
 Donald Maclean, 1st Laird of Brolas (17th century)
 Donald Maclean, 3rd Laird of Brolas (c.1670–1725)
 Donald Maclean, 5th Laird of Torloisk (died 1748)

Politicians
 Donald Maclean (1800–1874), British barrister and MP for Oxford
 Donald Maclean (British politician) (1864–1932), British Liberal politician
 Donald McLean (New Zealand politician) (1820–1877)
 Donald A. McLean (1907–1973), Canadian Senator from New Brunswick
 Donald H. McLean (1884–1975), US Congressman from New Jersey

Others
 Donald McLean (footballer) (born 1934), Scottish footballer
 Donald McLean (fur trader) (1805–1864), also known as Samadlin, Scottish fur trader in Canada
 Donald MacLean (ice hockey) (born 1977), Canadian hockey player
 Donald Maclean (judge) (1877–1947), Canadian politician and judge
 Donald McLean (pastoralist) (1772–1850), pastoralist in South Australia
 Donald Maclean (principal) (1869–1943), Scottish school principal
 Donald McLean (sailor) (born 1955), Caymanian sailor
 Donald Maclean (spy) (1913–1983), British diplomat and Soviet spy

See also
 Don Maclean (disambiguation) 
 John Donald McLean (1820–1866) Treasurer of Queensland, Australia.
 Donald MacLean Kerr (born 1939), American civil servant